In mathematics, the Kantor double is a Jordan superalgebra structure on the sum of two copies of a Poisson algebra.

References

Non-associative algebras